Campolieto is a comune (municipality) in the Province of Campobasso in the Italian region Molise, located about    northeast of Campobasso.

Campolieto borders the following municipalities: Castellino del Biferno, Matrice, Monacilioni, Morrone del Sannio, Ripabottoni, San Giovanni in Galdo.

Twin towns — sister cities
Campolieto is twinned with:

  Arese, Italy (2006)

References

External links
 Official website

Cities and towns in Molise